"Sending You a Little Christmas'" is a 2003 single by Jim Brickman with vocals by Kristy Starling. The single was written by Brickman along with Billy Mann and Victoria Shaw.  The single was a cut from  Brickman's "Peace" CD and was his second number one on the Adult Contemporary chart. "Sending You a Little Christmas" spent one week at number one, and only charted on the Adult Contemporary chart.

References

2003 singles
American Christmas songs
Songs written by Jim Brickman
Songs written by Billy Mann
Songs written by Victoria Shaw (singer)